Hitiaa is an associated commune located in the commune of Hitiaa O Te Ra on the island of Tahiti, in French Polynesia.

References

Towns and villages in Tahiti